Proneura prolongata is a species of damselfly in the family Protoneuridae. It is found in possibly Brazil and possibly Peru. Its natural habitat is rivers.

References

Protoneuridae
Insects described in 1889
Taxonomy articles created by Polbot